Union Sportive de Coutras is a Roller Hockey team from Coutras, Aquitaine, France.

History
Coutras was founded in 1936 and won 16 French titles.

The women's team won ten times the national championship and finished as runner-up of the 2014–15 CERH Women's European Cup.

Trophies
 16 French Championship
 10 French Women's Championship

External links
US Coutras Official Website

Roller hockey clubs in France
Sports clubs established in 1936
1936 establishments in France